Abortion in Chad was prohibited by law prior to December 2016, when the National Assembly of Chad passed an updated penal code decriminalising abortion under limited circumstances. Article 358  of that codestates that abortion is allowed in case of sexual assault, rape, incest or when the pregnancy endangers the mental or physical health or the life of the mother or the fetus. On 8 May 2017, the new penal code was enacted by the President Idriss Deby. It became law on 1 August 2017.

References 

Health in Chad
Chad
Chad